Jonathan Weisbrod is an American film producer and screenwriter. His films include the full-length drama-comedy feature, "Lies I Told My Little Sister" (2012), and comedy-horror "Bear With Us", in addition to the award-winning comedy short, "Break A Leg" (2011), and the multiple audience-award-winning comedy short, "Beyond Belief" (2012), among others.

Education
Weisbrod received a B.F.A. at the NYU Tisch School of the Arts, Maurice Kanbar Institute of Film & Television

Awards and nominations
 Audience Award, Best Student Short Film, 2013 Dam Short Film Festival, Boulder City, Nevada for "Beyond Belief"
 Best Comedy Nomination, 2012 Supershorts International Film Festival, London, England, for "Beyond Belief"
 Best Picture and Best Producing, 2012 New Voices & Visions Film Festival, New York University, for short film, "Break A Leg," directed by William J. Stribling.
 2011 David Chase Scholarship for Screenwriting.
 2008 AFI (American Film Institute) Screen Nation Grand Prize, AFI Screen Education News, American Film Institute, July 21, 2008

References

American film producers
Tisch School of the Arts alumni
Living people
Year of birth missing (living people)